Grande Cheese is a privately owned grocery chain in the Greater Toronto Area, Ontario, Canada. Its corporate office is located in Toronto, and had been previously located in Orangeville.

History
Grande Cheese was founded in 1958 by Italian immigrant Marco Contardi who immigrated to Canada in 1955 from Anzano di Puglia, Apulia. Before he immigrated to Canada, Contardi worked for a landlord tending to his sheep and cows where he learned to be a cheesemaker. Upon arriving in Canada, Contardi soon opened Grande Cheese on a small farm in Orangeville, delivering their cheeses to Italian grocery stores, restaurants, and bakeries.

Later, Grande Cheese expanded to a  facility in Vaughan.

Locations
Five locations:
 Toronto (2)
 Vaughan (2)
 Richmond Hill

See also
List of supermarket chains in Canada

References

External links

1958 establishments in Ontario
Companies based in North York
Retail companies established in 1958
Supermarkets of Canada
Privately held companies of Canada
Canadian companies established in 1958